Jerry Lewis appeared in movies and television from 1949 to 2017.

Martin and Lewis in film

Jerry Lewis in film

Television

Commercials

Other works

Notes

References

Male actor filmographies
American filmographies
Filmography